Bradley J. "Brad" Smith (born 7 July 1977) is a former Australian rules footballer who played with Collingwood in the Australian Football League (AFL).

Smith was originally drafted by Richmond, from Claremont, but only played reserves football in his two seasons at the club. Both Smith and his teammate Jamie Tape were traded to Collingwood prior to the 1998 AFL season, in return for Aaron James and the draft selection used on Andrew Kellaway.

A ruckman, he finally made his AFL debut in the 2000 season, when he had four disposals and 14 hit outs in a loss to Geelong at the Melbourne Cricket Ground. He didn't make any further appearances.

In 2010 he joined Western Border Football League club Heywood.

References

External links
 
 

1977 births
Australian rules footballers from Western Australia
Collingwood Football Club players
Claremont Football Club players
Heywood Football Club players
Living people